Frank Aaen (born 25 July 1951, in Nørresundby) is a Danish economist and Member of Parliament (the Folketing) for Enhedslisten. On 15 March 2006, he suffered a thrombosis but was back in the Folketing by April. 

Frank Aaen is an educated economist and holds a master's degree in economics from Aalborg University which he received in 1985.

Politics 
Aaen has been a member of parliament from 1994 to 2003 and 2005 to 2015. He is a member of the left-wing political party Red-Green Alliance. In 2006, he called for the detention of Israeli Foreign Minister Tzipi Livni during her trip to Denmark for the purpose of determining her culpability as a member of the Israeli cabinet for alleged Israeli war crimes. In January 2019, he was accused by Kristian Jensen of spreading false information regarding the sale of energy company Radius. Aaen maintained that the company was being sold at a cheap price. The Danish Ministry of Finance has canceled the sale citing a lack of political support.

References 

1951 births
Living people
Members of the Folketing 1994–1998
Members of the Folketing 1998–2001
Members of the Folketing 2005–2007
Members of the Folketing 2007–2011
Members of the Folketing 2011–2015
People from Nørresundby
Aalborg University alumni
Red–Green Alliance (Denmark) politicians